"Flashlight" is a song by English singer Ellie Goulding featuring production work from DJ Fresh. It was released as a single on 28 September 2014 in the United Kingdom. The song originally appeared on Goulding's Halcyon Days (2013), the reissue of her second studio album, Halcyon (2012). The Invisible Men assisted the artists in writing the song.

Background
In an interview with Capital FM on 9 February 2014, DJ Fresh said that he and Goulding had recorded a new version of the song "Flashlight" for single release later in 2014.

Track listing

Charts

Release history

References

2013 songs
2014 singles
DJ Fresh songs
Ellie Goulding songs
Ministry of Sound singles
Polydor Records singles
Song recordings produced by DJ Fresh
Songs written by DJ Fresh
Songs written by Ellie Goulding
Songs written by George Astasio
Songs written by Jason Pebworth
Songs written by Jon Shave